Catri 25 is a foiled trimaran marketed by Catrigroup of Latvia that underwent initial testing in 2013–2014. It was designed as "an ultimate speed Category C cruising & racing micro-trimaran", with speed advantages provided by the hydrofoils. It follows the previous Catri23 and Catri24 designs.

See also
 List of multihulls

References

Trimarans